Cyperus volodia is a species of sedge that is endemic to western parts of Madagascar.

The species was first formally described by the botanist Henri Chermezon in 1920.

See also
 List of Cyperus species

References

volodia
Taxa named by Henri Chermezon
Endemic flora of Madagascar
Plants described in 1920